Let's Fall in Love is an album compiling singles recorded by Fran Warren (originally on RCA Victor Records) from 1947 to 1951. It was released by Dutton Vocalion on Compact Disc on April 8, 2003.

Track listing

Fran Warren albums
2003 compilation albums